"Good Morning" is a song with music by Nacio Herb Brown and lyrics by Arthur Freed, originally written for the film Babes in Arms (1939) and performed by Judy Garland and Mickey Rooney.

Covers
The song was performed in the musical film Singin' in the Rain (1952) by Betty Noyes (dubbing for Debbie Reynolds), Gene Kelly and Donald O'Connor. In 2004, the version in Singin' in the Rain was listed at #72 on AFI's 100 Years...100 Songs survey of the top tunes in American cinema.

References

1939 songs
Songs with lyrics by Arthur Freed
Songs with music by Nacio Herb Brown
Judy Garland songs
Gene Kelly songs